Constable's Miscellany was a part publishing serial established by Archibald Constable. Three numbers made up a volume; many of the works were divided into several volumes. The price of a number was one shilling. The full series title was Constable's Miscellany of Original and Selected Publications, in the Various Departments of Literature, Science, and the Arts.

Archibald Constable died in 1827, and the Miscellany was taken over by a consortium of Aitken, Henry Constable, and a London publisher. When the publisher went bankrupt in 1831, the project became relatively dormant. The entire list was later advertised by the London firm of Whittaker & Co. There were 80 volumes in all, the first appearing in 1826 and the last in 1835.

Background and influence
Projected before the Panic of 1825, the Miscellany was dedicated to George IV of the United Kingdom, a privilege gained for Constable by Walter Scott. The initial plans were more ambitious; Constable himself became bankrupt in 1827, and this final project proceeded under constraints.

The Miscellany's first editor was John Aitken. As a series of less expensive contemporary non-fiction books for a popular audience, by a commercial publisher, it was the precedent for Murray's Family Library, which it anticipated by two years. It was recognised in the new genre, of "libraries of useful knowledge".

Constable's project is recognised as initiating a publishing phenomenon of the later 1820s. Cheap editions marketed as small libraries were seen also in the Library of Useful Knowledge, Library of Entertaining Knowledge, Lardner's Cabinet Cyclopædia, and series by Henry Colburn and Abraham John Valpy.

List of Constable's Miscellany

Revival of the series 
"A version of the series was revived in the mid 1850s, the early 1880s, and, finally, in 1928..." The 1929 incarnation of the series was named "Constable's Miscellany of Original and Selected Publications in Literature until about 1939.

Notes

Lists of British books
1820s in England
1830s in England
Series of books
19th-century British literature